The River Grom is a short tributary of the River Medway near Tunbridge Wells in south-east England. Flowing westwards through High Rocks and Groombridge, it forms the Kent-Sussex border for part of its length. A diversion feeds the moat at Groombridge Place.

References

External links
Geograph
River Grom Tunnels

Grom
Grom
1Grom